Fire history, the ecological science of the study of the history of wildfires, is a subdiscipline of fire ecology. Patterns of forest fires in historical and prehistorical time provide information relevant to the pattern of vegetation in modern landscapes. It provides an estimate of the historical range of variability of a natural disturbance regime, and can be used to identify the processes affecting the occurrence of fire. Fire history reconstructions are achieved by compiling atlases of past fires, using the tree ring record from fire scars and tree ages, and the charcoal record from soils and sediments.

Prehistoric fires 
Sustained wildfire can only exist once oxygen levels and fuel sources were present in sufficient quantities. Between 400 and 450 million year ago, fire became a feature of the landscape. The presence of fusain (fossil charcoal), beginning in the early Carboniferous attests to this fire history and forms an important element of the Cretaceous–Paleogene boundary.

Mapped data

Tree-ring data

The growth record of a tree in seasonal climates is preserved in the growth rings in the stem wood; the field of dendrochronology is the study of the record of climate and other events preserved in the growth record. Each growth ring represents one year of life. The thickness of each ring indicates the amount of wood produced during that growing season. At the beginning of the growing season large cells are able to quickly divide creating a light colored wood. When growth slows down, generally in colder months, a darker wood is created from smaller cells dividing more slowly. Thus, one year is represented by a light inner ring and a darker outer ring.

Rings can be counted from dead trees as well as stumps left behind from logging. A sample can be collected from a living tree using tools like the increment borer. The increment borer is a hollow steel tube used to extract a core sample from a tree’s trunk. The growth rings in a core sample are counted to determine the age of that tree. Ages of stand-replacing fires may be determined by determining the cohort-age of trees that established after a fire. For example, tree-ring dating of large stands will show the age of the forest, and may provide an estimate of when the last large disturbance event occurred.

Sometimes growth rings exhibit scars. A fire scar forms when heat kills the vascular cambium beneath the bark, which then heals over subsequent years as growth rings curl over the scarred area, thus protecting the tree from infection. This method can be used to date the year a fire occurred. Observing the scars establishes the timeline of a forest fire and the time between fires at a site. Surveying many trees over a large sample area provides a view to individual fire events and the overall fire regime. Not all tree species scar and show evidence of fire. Most pine species in the subgenus Pinus readily produce scars that are protected by resin; such scarring on other trees may result in death, leaving no fire record behind.

Research and data examples
Prior to Euro-American settlement in western North America, fire histories from scars preserved in ponderosa pine forests often reveal a pattern of frequent fire (often with 5 to 20 year intervals in a single area), with a pattern in time and space strongly related to past variations in climate. Fuel reduction from grazing and fire suppression greatly reduced the amount of fire in dry forests over the last 100 years.

A study by Arne Buechiling and William L. Baker in 2004 identified 41 fire events beginning in 1533 in a 9200-ha study area north of Estes Park, Colorado. They sampled 3461 tree cores and 212 fire scars. Fire scar data provided greater insight into the fire event parameters. Of the 41 fires, 22 where high-severity crown fires, 7 low-severity surface fires, and 8 mixed-severity fires. Fires larger than 300 ha were few, but composed a substantial proportion of the area burned since 1700. Drought periods led to larger fires.

There is little known about the fire history in some places. Central Europe for instance has a lack of intact forests with old growth trees or an abundance of dead or cut down trees that can be used to reconstruct the past fire regimes. An exception to this lacking history is the Bialowieza Primeval Forest in Poland. A group of researchers were able to use a 350-year tree-ring fire record to reconstruct the fire history in precise detail. This is a shining example of how the method can be used in a place with lost or no written history of a fire regime.

See also 
 Fire ecology
 Pyrogeography
 Fossil record of fire

References 

Ecological succession
Fire
Landscape ecology